Rhynchonella pugnus is an extinct species of brachiopods.

References 

Prehistoric brachiopods
Rhynchonellida